Digital marketing is the component of marketing that uses the Internet and online based digital technologies such as desktop computers, mobile phones and other digital media and platforms to promote products and services. Its development during the 1990s and 2000s changed the way brands and businesses use technology for marketing. As digital platforms became increasingly incorporated into marketing plans and everyday life, and as people increasingly use digital devices instead of visiting physical shops, digital marketing campaigns have become prevalent, employing combinations of search engine optimization (SEO), search engine marketing (SEM), content marketing, influencer marketing, content automation, campaign marketing, data-driven marketing, e-commerce marketing, social media marketing, social media optimization, e-mail direct marketing, display advertising, e–books, and optical disks and games have become commonplace. Digital marketing extends to non-Internet channels that provide digital media, such as television, mobile phones (SMS and MMS), callback, and on-hold mobile ring tones. The extension to non-Internet channels differentiates digital marketing from online marketing.

History
Digital marketing effectively began in 1990 when the Archie search engine was created as an index for FTP sites. In the 1980s, the storage capacity of computers was already big enough to store huge volumes of customer information. Companies started choosing online techniques, such as database marketing, rather than limited list broker. Databases allowed companies to track customers' information more effectively, transforming the relationship between buyer and seller.  

In the 1990s, the term digital marketing was coined. With the development of server/client architecture and the popularity of personal computers, Customer Relationship Management (CRM) applications became a significant factor in marketing technology. Fierce competition forced vendors to include more service into their software, for example, marketing, sales and service applications. Marketers were also able to own online customer data through eCRM software after the Internet was born. This led to the first clickable banner ad going live in 1994, which was the "You Will" campaign by AT&T and over the first four months of it going live, 44% of all people who saw it clicked on the ad.

In the 2000s, with increasing numbers of Internet users and the birth of iPhone, customers began searching products and making decisions about their needs online first, instead of consulting a salesperson, which created a new problem for the marketing department of a company. In addition, a survey in 2000 in the United Kingdom found that most retailers had not registered their own domain address. These problems encouraged marketers to find new ways to integrate digital technology into market development.

In 2007, marketing automation was developed as a response to the ever-evolving marketing climate. Marketing automation is the process by which software is used to automate conventional marketing processes. Marketing automation helped companies segment customers, launch multichannel marketing campaigns, and provide personalized information for customers., based on their specific activities. In this way, users' activity (or lack thereof) triggers a personal message that is customized to the user in their preferred platform. However, despite the benefits of marketing automation many companies are struggling to adopt it to their everyday uses correctly.

Digital marketing became more sophisticated in the 2000s and the 2010s, 
when the proliferation of devices' capable of accessing digital media led to sudden growth. Statistics produced in 2012 and 2013 showed that digital marketing was still growing.
With the development of social media in the 2000s, such as LinkedIn, Facebook, YouTube and Twitter, consumers became highly dependent on digital electronics in daily lives. Therefore, they expected a seamless user experience across different channels for searching product's information. The change of customer behavior improved the diversification of marketing technology.

Digital marketing is also referred to as 'online marketing', 'internet marketing' or 'web marketing'. The term digital marketing has grown in popularity over time. In the USA online marketing is still a popular term. In Italy, digital marketing is referred to as web marketing. Worldwide digital marketing has become the most common term, especially after the year 2013.

Digital media growth was estimated at 4.5 trillion online ads served annually with digital media spend at 48% growth in 2010. An increasing portion of advertising stems from businesses employing Online Behavioural Advertising (OBA) to tailor advertising for internet users, but OBA raises concern of consumer privacy and data protection.

New non-linear marketing approach
Nonlinear marketing, a type of interactive marketing, is a long-term marketing approach which builds on businesses collecting information about an Internet user's online activities and trying to be visible in multiple areas.

Unlike traditional marketing techniques, which involve direct, one-way messaging to consumers (via print, television, and radio advertising), nonlinear digital marketing strategies are centered on reaching prospective customers across multiple online channels.

Combined with higher consumer knowledge and the demand for more sophisticated consumer offerings, this change has forced many businesses to rethink their outreach strategy and adopt or incorporate omnichannel, nonlinear marketing techniques to maintain sufficient brand exposure, engagement, and reach.

Nonlinear marketing strategies involve efforts to adapt the advertising to different platforms, and to tailor the advertising to different individual buyers rather than a large coherent audience.

Tactics may include:
 Search engine optimization (SEO)
 Social media marketing 
 Video marketing 
 Email marketing
 Blogging & affiliate marketing
 Website marketing
 Paid search/contextual advertising
Search engine marketing

Some studies indicate that consumer responses to traditional marketing approaches are becoming less predictable for businesses.  According to a 2018 study, nearly 90% of online consumers in the United States researched products and brands online before visiting the store or making a purchase. The Global Web Index estimated that in 2018, a little more than 50% of consumers researched products on social media. Businesses often rely on individuals portraying their products in a positive light on social media, and may adapt their marketing strategy to target people with large social media followings in order to generate such comments. In this manner, businesses can use consumers to advertise their products or services, decreasing the cost for the company.

Brand awareness
One of the key objectives of modern digital marketing is to raise brand awareness, the extent to which customers and the general public are familiar with and recognize a particular brand.

Enhancing brand awareness is important in digital marketing, and marketing in general, because of its impact on brand perception and consumer decision-making. According to the 2015 essay, "Impact of Brand on Consumer Behavior":

"Brand awareness, as one of the fundamental dimensions of brand equity, is often considered to be a prerequisite of consumers’ buying decision, as it represents the main factor for including a brand in the consideration set. Brand awareness can also influence consumers’ perceived risk assessment and their confidence in the purchase decision, due to familiarity with the brand and its characteristics."

Recent trends show that businesses and digital marketers are prioritizing brand awareness, focusing more on their digital marketing efforts on cultivating brand recognition and recall than in previous years. This is evidenced by a 2019 Content Marketing Institute study, which found that 81% of digital marketers have worked on enhancing brand recognition over the past year.

Another Content Marketing Institute survey revealed 89% of B2B marketers now believe improving brand awareness to be more important than efforts directed at increasing sales.

Increasing brand awareness is a focus of digital marketing strategy for a number of reasons:

 The growth of online shopping. A survey by Statista projects 230.5 million people in the United States will use the internet to shop, compare, and buy products by 2021, up from 209.6 million in 2016. Research from business software firm Salesforce found 87% of people began searches for products and brands on digital channels in 2018.
 The role of digital interaction in customer behavior. It’s estimated that 70% of all retail purchases made in the U.S. are influenced to some degree by an interaction with a brand online.
 The growing influence and role of brand awareness in online consumer decision-making: 82% of online shoppers searching for services give preference to brands they know of.
 The use, convenience, and influence of social media. A recent report by Hootsuite estimated there were more than 3.4 billion active users on social media platforms, a 9% increase from 2018. A 2019 survey by The Manifest states that 74% of social media users follow brands on social sites, and 96% of people who follow businesses also engage with those brands on social platforms. According to Deloitte, one in three U.S. consumers are influenced by social media when buying a product, while 47% of millennials factor their interaction with a brand on social when making a purchase.

Online methods used to build brand awareness 
Digital marketing strategies may include the use of one or more online channels and techniques (omnichannel) to increase brand awareness among consumers.

Building brand awareness may involve such methods/tools as:

Search engine optimization (SEO) 
Search engine optimization techniques may be used to improve the visibility of business websites and brand-related content for common industry-related search queries.

The importance of SEO to increase brand awareness is said to correlate with the growing influence of search results and search features like featured snippets, knowledge panels, and local SEO on customer behavior.

Search engine marketing (SEM) 
SEM, also known as PPC advertising, involves the purchase of ad space in prominent, visible positions atop search results pages and websites. Search ads have been shown to have a positive impact on brand recognition, awareness and conversions.

33% of searchers who click on paid ads do so because they directly respond to their particular search query.

Social media marketing 
Social media marketing has the characteristics of being in the marketing state and interacting with consumers all the time, emphasizing content and interaction skills. The marketing process needs to be monitored, analyzed, summarized and managed in real-time, and the marketing target needs to be adjusted according to the real-time feedback from the market and consumers. 70% of marketers list increasing brand awareness as their number one goal for marketing on social media platforms. Facebook, Instagram, Twitter, and YouTube are listed as the top platforms currently used by social media marketing teams. As of 2021, LinkedIn has been added as one of the most-used social media platforms by business leaders for its professional networking capabilities.

Content marketing 
56% of marketers believe personalization content – brand-centered blogs, articles, social updates, videos, landing pages – improves brand recall and engagement.

Developments and strategies 
One of the major changes that occurred in traditional marketing was the "emergence of digital marketing", this led to the reinvention of marketing strategies in order to adapt to this major change in traditional marketing.

As digital marketing is dependent on technology which is ever-evolving and fast-changing, the same features should be expected from digital marketing developments and strategies. This portion is an attempt to qualify or segregate the notable highlights existing and being used as of press time.

 Segmentation: More focus has been placed on segmentation within digital marketing, in order to target specific markets in both business-to-business and business-to-consumer sectors.
 Influencer marketing: Important nodes are identified within related communities, known as influencers. This is becoming an important concept in digital targeting. Influencers allow brands to take advantage of social media and the large audiences available on many of these platforms. It is possible to reach influencers via paid advertising, such as Facebook Advertising or Google Ads campaigns, or through sophisticated sCRM (social customer relationship management) software, such as SAP C4C, Microsoft Dynamics, Sage CRM and Salesforce CRM. Many universities now focus, at Masters level, on engagement strategies for influencers.

To summarize, Pull digital marketing is characterized by consumers actively seeking marketing content while Push digital marketing occurs when marketers send messages without that content being actively sought by the recipients.

 Online behavioral advertising is the practice of collecting information about a user's online activity over time, "on a particular device and across different, unrelated websites, in order to deliver advertisements tailored to that user's interests and preferences." Such Advertisements are based on site retargeting are customized based on each user behavior and pattern.
 Collaborative Environment: A collaborative environment can be set up between the organization, the technology service provider, and the digital agencies to optimize effort, resource sharing, reusability and communications.  Additionally, organizations are inviting their customers to help them better understand how to service them. This source of data is called user-generated content. Much of this is acquired via company websites where the organization invites people to share ideas that are then evaluated by other users of the site. The most popular ideas are evaluated and implemented in some form. Using this method of acquiring data and developing new products can foster the organization's relationship with its customer as well as spawn ideas that would otherwise be overlooked. UGC is low-cost advertising as it is directly from the consumers and can save advertising costs for the organization.
Data-driven advertising: Users generate a lot of data in every step they take on the path of customer journey and brands can now use that data to activate their known audience with data-driven programmatic media buying. Without exposing customers' privacy, users' data can be collected from digital channels (e.g.: when the customer visits a website, reads an e-mail, or launches and interact with a brand's mobile app), brands can also collect data from real-world customer interactions, such as brick and mortar stores visits and from CRM and sales engines datasets. Also known as people-based marketing or addressable media, data-driven advertising is empowering brands to find their loyal customers in their audience and deliver in real time a much more personal communication, highly relevant to each customers' moment and actions.

An important consideration today while deciding on a strategy is that the digital tools have democratized the promotional landscape.

 Remarketing: Remarketing plays a major role in digital marketing. This tactic allows marketers to publish targeted ads in front of an interest category or a defined audience, generally called searchers in web speak, they have either searched for particular products or services or visited a website for some purpose.
 Game advertising: Game ads are advertisements that exist within computer or video games. One of the most common examples of in-game advertising is billboards appearing in sports games. In-game ads also might appear as brand-name products like guns, cars, or clothing that exist as gaming status symbols.

Six principles for building online brand content: 

 Do not consider individuals as consumers;
 Have an editorial position;
 Define an identity for the brand;
 Maintain a continuity of contents;
 Ensure a regular interaction with audience;
 Have a channel for events.

The new digital era has enabled brands to selectively target their customers that may potentially be interested in their brand or based on previous browsing interests. Businesses can now use social media to select the age range, location, gender, and interests of whom they would like their targeted post to be seen. Furthermore, based on a customer's recent search history they can be ‘followed’ on the internet so they see advertisements from similar brands, products, and services, This allows businesses to target the specific customers that they know and feel will most benefit from their product or service, something that had limited capabilities up until the digital era.

 Tourism marketing: Advanced tourism, responsible and sustainable tourism, social media and online tourism marketing, and geographic information systems. As a broader research field matures and attracts more diverse and in-depth academic research

Ineffective forms of digital marketing
Digital marketing activity is still growing across the world according to the headline global marketing index. A study published in September 2018, found that global outlays on digital marketing tactics are approaching $100 billion. Digital media continues to rapidly grow. While the marketing budgets are expanding, traditional media is declining. Digital media helps brands reach consumers to engage with their product or service in a personalized way. Five areas, which are outlined as current industry practices that are often ineffective are prioritizing clicks, balancing search and display, understanding mobiles, targeting, viewability, brand safety and invalid traffic, and cross-platform measurement. Why these practices are ineffective and some ways around making these aspects effective are discussed surrounding the following points.

Prioritizing clicks
Prioritizing clicks refers to display click ads, although advantageous by being ‘simple, fast and inexpensive’ rates for display ads in 2016 is only 0.10 percent in the United States. This means one in a thousand click ads is relevant therefore having little effect. This displays that marketing companies should not just use click ads to evaluate the effectiveness of display advertisements.

Balancing search and display
Balancing search and display for digital display ads is important. marketers tend to look at the last search and attribute all of the effectiveness of this. This, in turn, disregards other marketing efforts, which establish brand value within the consumer's mind. ComScore determined through drawing on data online, produced by over one hundred multichannel retailers that digital display marketing poses strengths when compared with or positioned alongside, paid search. This is why it is advised that when someone clicks on a display ad the company opens a landing page, not its home page. A landing page typically has something to draw the customer in to search beyond this page. Commonly marketers see increased sales among people exposed to a search ad. But the fact of how many people you can reach with a display campaign compared to a search campaign should be considered.  Multichannel retailers have an increased reach if the display is considered in synergy with search campaigns. Overall, both search and display aspects are valued as display campaigns build awareness for the brand so that more people are likely to click on these digital ads when running a search campaign.

Understanding Mobiles
Understanding mobile devices is a significant aspect of digital marketing because smartphones and tablets are now responsible for 64% of the time US consumers are online. Apps provide a big opportunity as well as challenge for the marketers because firstly the app needs to be downloaded and secondly the person needs to actually use it. This may be difficult as ‘half the time spent on smartphone apps occurs on the individuals single most used app, and almost 85% of their time on the top four rated apps’. Mobile advertising can assist in achieving a variety of commercial objectives and it is effective due to taking over the entire screen, and voice or status is likely to be considered highly. However, the message must not be seen or thought of as intrusive.  Disadvantages of digital media used on mobile devices also include limited creative capabilities, and reach.  Although there are many positive aspects including the user's entitlement to select product information, digital media creating a flexible message platform and there is potential for direct selling.

Cross-platform measurement
The number of marketing channels continues to expand, as measurement practices are growing in complexity. A cross-platform view must be used to unify audience measurement and media planning. Market researchers need to understand how the Omni-channel affects consumer's behavior, although when advertisements are on a consumer's device this does not get measured. Significant aspects to cross-platform measurement involve deduplication and understanding that you have reached an incremental level with another platform, rather than delivering more impressions against people that have previously been reached. An example is ‘ESPN and comScore partnered on Project Blueprint discovering the sports broadcaster achieved a 21% increase in unduplicated daily reach thanks to digital advertising’. Television and radio industries are the electronic media, which competes with digital and other technological advertising. Yet television advertising is not directly competing with online digital advertising due to being able to cross platform with digital technology. Radio also gains power through cross platforms, in online streaming content. Television and radio continue to persuade and affect the audience, across multiple platforms.

Targeting, viewability, brand safety, and invalid traffic
Targeting, viewability, brand safety, and invalid traffic all are aspects used by marketers to help advocate digital advertising. Cookies are a form of digital advertising, which are tracking tools within desktop devices, causing difficulty, with shortcomings including deletion by web browsers, the inability to sort between multiple users of a device, inaccurate estimates for unique visitors, overstating reach, understanding frequency, problems with ad servers, which cannot distinguish between when cookies have been deleted and when consumers have not previously been exposed to an ad. Due to the inaccuracies influenced by cookies, demographics in the target market are low and vary. Another element, which is affected by digital marketing, is ‘viewability’ or whether the ad was actually seen by the consumer. Many ads are not seen by a consumer and may never reach the right demographic segment. Brand safety is another issue of whether or not the ad was produced in the context of being unethical or having offensive content. Recognizing fraud when an ad is exposed is another challenge marketers face. This relates to invalid traffic as premium sites are more effective at detecting fraudulent traffic, although non-premium sites are more so the problem.

Channels
Digital Marketing Channels are systems based on the Internet that can create, accelerate, and transmit product value from producer to a consumer terminal, through digital networks. Digital marketing is facilitated by multiple Digital Marketing channels, as an advertiser one's core objective is to find channels which result in maximum two-way communication and a better overall ROI for the brand. There are multiple digital marketing channels available namely:

 Affiliate marketing - Affiliate marketing is perceived to not be considered a safe, reliable, and easy means of marketing through online platforms. This is due to a lack of reliability in terms of affiliates that can produce the demanded number of new customers. As a result of this risk and bad affiliates, it leaves the brand prone to exploitation in terms of claiming commission that isn't honestly acquired. Legal means may offer some protection against this, yet there are limitations in recovering any losses or investment. Despite this, affiliate marketing allows the brand to market towards smaller publishers and websites with smaller traffic. Brands that choose to use this marketing often should beware of such risks involved and look to associate with affiliates in which rules are laid down between the parties involved to assure and minimize the risk involved.
Display advertising - As the term implies, online display advertising deals with showcasing promotional messages or ideas to the consumer on the internet. This includes a wide range of advertisements like advertising blogs, networks, interstitial ads, contextual data, ads on search engines, classified or dynamic advertisements, etc. The method can target specific audience tuning in from different types of locals to view a particular advertisement, the variations can be found as the most productive element of this method.
Email marketing - Email marketing in comparison to other forms of digital marketing is considered cheap. It is also a way to rapidly communicate a message such as their value proposition to existing or potential customers. Yet this channel of communication may be perceived by recipients to be bothersome and irritating especially to new or potential customers, therefore the success of email marketing is reliant on the language and visual appeal applied. In terms of visual appeal, there are indications that using graphics/visuals that are relevant to the message which is attempting to be sent, yet less visual graphics to be applied with initial emails are more effective in-turn creating a relatively personal feel to the email. In terms of language, the style is the main factor in determining how captivating the email is. Using a casual tone invokes a warmer, gentler and more inviting feel to the email, compared to a more formal tone. 
Search engine marketing - Search engine marketing (SEM) is a form of Internet marketing that involves the promotion of websites by increasing their visibility in search engine results pages (SERPs) primarily through paid advertising. SEM may incorporate Search engine optimization, which adjusts or rewrites website content and site architecture to achieve a higher ranking in search engine results pages to enhance pay per click (PPC) listings.
Social Media Marketing - The term 'Digital Marketing' has a number of marketing facets as it supports different channels used in and among these, comes the Social Media. When we use social media channels (Facebook, Twitter, Pinterest, Instagram, Google+, etc.) to market a product or service, the strategy is called Social Media Marketing. It is a procedure wherein strategies are made and executed to draw in traffic for a website or to gain the attention of buyers over the web using different social media platforms.
Social networking service - A social networking service is an online platform which people use to build social networks or social relations with other people who share similar personal or career interests, activities, backgrounds or real-life connections
In-game advertising - In-Game advertising is defined as the "inclusion of products or brands within a digital game." The game allows brands or products to place ads within their game, either in a subtle manner or in the form of an advertisement banner. There are many factors that exist in whether brands are successful in the advertising of their brand/product, these being: Type of game, technical platform, 3-D and 4-D technology, game genre, congruity of brand and game, prominence of advertising within the game. Individual factors consist of attitudes towards placement advertisements, game involvement, product involvement, flow, or entertainment. The attitude towards the advertising also takes into account not only the message shown but also the attitude towards the game. Dependent on how enjoyable the game is will determine how the brand is perceived, meaning if the game isn't very enjoyable the consumer may subconsciously have a negative attitude towards the brand/product being advertised. In terms of Integrated Marketing Communication "integration of advertising in digital games into the general advertising, communication, and marketing strategy of the firm" is important as it results in a more clarity about the brand/product and creates a larger overall effect.
Online public relations - The use of the internet to communicate with both potential and current customers in the public realm.
Video advertising - This type of advertising in terms of digital/online means are advertisements that play on online videos e.g., YouTube videos.  This type of marketing has seen an increase in popularity over time. Online Video Advertising usually consists of three types: Pre-Roll advertisements which play before the video is watched, Mid-Roll advertisements which play during the video, or Post-Roll advertisements which play after the video is watched. Post-roll advertisements were shown to have better brand recognition in relation to the other types, where-as "ad-context congruity/incongruity plays an important role in reinforcing ad memorability". Due to selective attention from viewers, there is the likelihood that the message may not be received. The main advantage of video advertising is that it disrupts the viewing experience of the video and therefore there is a difficulty in attempting to avoid them. How a consumer interacts with online video advertising can come down to three stages: Pre attention, attention, and behavioral decision. These online advertisements give the brand/business options and choices. These consist of length, position, adjacent video content which all directly affect the effectiveness of the produced advertisement time, therefore manipulating these variables will yield different results. The length of the advertisement has shown to affect memorability where-as a longer duration resulted in increased brand recognition. This type of advertising, due to its nature of interruption of the viewer, it is likely that the consumer may feel as if their experience is being interrupted or invaded, creating negative perception of the brand. These advertisements are also available to be shared by the viewers, adding to the attractiveness of this platform. Sharing these videos can be equated to the online version of word by mouth marketing, extending number of people reached. Sharing videos creates six different outcomes: these being "pleasure, affection, inclusion, escape, relaxation, and control". As well, videos that have entertainment value are more likely to be shared, yet pleasure is the strongest motivator to pass videos on. Creating a ‘viral’ trend from a mass amount of a brand advertisement can maximize the outcome of an online video advert whether it be positive or a negative outcome.
Native Advertising - This involves the placement of paid content that replicates the look, feel, and oftentimes, the voice of a platform's existing content. It is most effective when used on digital platforms like websites, newsletters, and social media. Can be somewhat controversial as some critics feel it intentionally deceives consumers.
Content Marketing - This is an approach to marketing that focuses on gaining and retaining customers by offering helpful content to customers that improves the buying experience and creates brand awareness.  A brand may use this approach to hold a customer’s attention with the goal of influencing potential purchase decisions.
Sponsored Content - This utilises content created and paid for by a brand to promote a specific product or service.
Inbound Marketing- a market strategy that involves using content as a means to attract customers to a brand or product. Requires extensive research into the behaviors, interests, and habits of the brand's target market.
SMS Marketing: Although the popularity is decreasing day by day, still SMS marketing plays huge role to bring new user, provide direct updates, provide new offers etc.
Push Notification: In this digital era, Push Notification responsible for bringing new and abandoned customer through smart segmentation. Many online brands are using this to provide personalised appeals depending on the scenario of customer acquisition.

It is important for a firm to reach out to consumers and create a two-way communication model, as digital marketing allows consumers to give back feedback to the firm on a community-based site or straight directly to the firm via email. Firms should seek this long-term communication relationship by using multiple forms of channels and using promotional strategies related to their target consumer as well as word-of-mouth marketing.

Benefits of social media marketing 

Possible benefits of social media marketing include:

 Allows companies to promote themselves to large, diverse audiences that could not be reached through traditional marketing such as phone and email-based advertising.
Marketing on most social media platforms comes at little to no cost- making it accessible to virtually any size business.
Accommodates personalized and direct marketing that targets specific demographics and markets.
Companies can engage with customers directly, allowing them to obtain feedback and resolve issues almost immediately.
Ideal environment for a company to conduct market research.
Can be used as a means of obtaining information about competitors and boost competitive advantage.
Social platforms can be used to promote brand events, deals, and news.
Social platforms can also be used to offer incentives in the form of loyalty points and discounts.

Self-regulation
The ICC Code has integrated rules that apply to marketing communications using digital interactive media throughout the guidelines. There is also an entirely updated section dealing with issues specific to digital interactive media techniques and platforms. Code self-regulation on the use of digital interactive media includes:
 Clear and transparent mechanisms to enable consumers to choose not to have their data collected for advertising or marketing purposes;
 Clear indication that a social network site is commercial and is under the control or influence of a marketer;
 Limits are set so that marketers communicate directly only when there are reasonable grounds to believe that the consumer has an interest in what is being offered;
 Respect for the rules and standards of acceptable commercial behavior in social networks and the posting of marketing messages only when the forum or site has clearly indicated its willingness to receive them;
 Special attention and protection for children.

Strategy

Planning 

Digital marketing planning is a term used in marketing management.  It describes the first stage of forming a digital marketing strategy for the wider digital marketing system. The difference between digital and traditional marketing planning is that it uses digitally based communication tools and technology such as Social, Web, Mobile, Scannable Surface. Nevertheless, both are aligned with the vision, the mission of the company and the overarching business strategy.

Stages of planning 
Using Dr. Dave Chaffey's approach, the digital marketing planning (DMP) has three main stages: Opportunity, Strategy, and Action. He suggests that any business looking to implement a successful digital marketing strategy must structure their plan by looking at opportunity, strategy and action. This generic strategic approach often has phases of situation review, goal setting, strategy formulation, resource allocation and monitoring.

Opportunity 
To create an effective DMP, a business first needs to review the marketplace and set 'SMART' (Specific, Measurable, Actionable, Relevant, and Time-Bound) objectives. They can set SMART objectives by reviewing the current benchmarks and key performance indicators (KPIs) of the company and competitors. It is pertinent that the analytics used for the KPIs be customized to the type, objectives, mission, and vision of the company.

Companies can scan for marketing and sales opportunities by reviewing their own outreach as well as influencer outreach. This means they have competitive advantage because they are able to analyse their co-marketers influence and brand associations.

To seize the opportunity, the firm should summarize its current customers' personas and purchase journey from this they are able to deduce their digital marketing capability. This means they need to form a clear picture of where they are currently and how many resources, they can allocate for their digital marketing strategy i.e., labor, time, etc. By summarizing the purchase journey, they can also recognize gaps and growth for future marketing opportunities that will either meet objectives or propose new objectives and increase profit.

Strategy 
To create a planned digital strategy, the company must review their digital proposition (what you are offering to consumers) and communicate it using digital customer targeting techniques. So, they must define online value proposition (OVP), this means the company must express clearly what they are offering customers online e.g., brand positioning.

The company should also (re)select target market segments and personas and define digital targeting approaches.

After doing this effectively, it is important to review the marketing mix for online options. The marketing mix comprises the 4Ps – Product, Price, Promotion, and Place. Some academics have added three additional elements to the traditional 4Ps of marketing Process, Place, and Physical appearance making it 7Ps of marketing.

Action 

The third and final stage requires the firm to set a budget and management systems. These must be measurable touchpoints, such as the audience reached across all digital platforms. Furthermore, marketers must ensure the budget and management systems are integrating the paid, owned, and earned media of the company. The Action and final stage of planning also requires the company to set in place measurable content creation e.g. oral, visual or written online media.

After confirming the digital marketing plan, a scheduled format of digital communications (e.g. Gantt Chart) should be encoded throughout the internal operations of the company. This ensures that all platforms used fall in line and complement each other for the succeeding stages of digital marketing strategy.

Understanding the market 
One way marketers can reach out to consumers and understand their thought process is through what is called an empathy map. An empathy map is a four-step process. The first step is through asking questions that the consumer would be thinking in their demographic. The second step is to describe the feelings that the consumer may be having. The third step is to think about what the consumer would say in their situation. The final step is to imagine what the consumer will try to do based on the other three steps. This map is so marketing teams can put themselves in their target demographics shoes. Web Analytics are also a very important way to understand consumers. They show the habits that people have online for each website. One particular form of these analytics is predictive analytics which helps marketers figure out what route consumers are on. This uses the information gathered from other analytics and then creates different predictions of what people will do so that companies can strategize on what to do next, according to the people's trends.

 Consumer behavior: the habits or attitudes of a consumer that influences the buying process of a product or service. Consumer behavior impacts virtually every stage of the buying process specifically in relation to digital environments and devices.
Predictive analytics: a form of data mining that involves using existing data to predict potential future trends or behaviors.  Can assist companies in predicting future behavior of customers.
Buyer persona: employing research of consumer behavior regarding habits like brand awareness and buying behavior to profile prospective customers. Establishing a buyer persona helps a company better understand their audience and their specific wants/needs.
Marketing Strategy: strategic planning employed by a brand to determine potential positioning within a market as well as the prospective target audience. It involves two key elements: segmentation and positioning. By developing a marketing strategy, a company is able to better anticipate and plan for each step in the marketing and buying process.

Sharing economy
The "sharing economy" refers to an economic pattern that aims to obtain a resource that is not fully used. Nowadays, the sharing economy has had an unimagined effect on many traditional elements including labor, industry, and distribution system. This effect is not negligible that some industries are obviously under threat. The sharing economy is influencing the traditional marketing channels by changing the nature of some specific concept including ownership, assets, and recruitment.

Digital marketing channels and traditional marketing channels are similar in function that the value of the product or service is passed from the original producer to the end user by a kind of supply chain. Digital Marketing channels, however, consist of internet systems that create, promote, and deliver products or services from producer to consumer through digital networks. Increasing changes to marketing channels has been a significant contributor to the expansion and growth of the sharing economy. Such changes to marketing channels has prompted unprecedented and historic growth. In addition to this typical approach, the built-in control, efficiency and low cost of digital marketing channels is an essential features in the application of sharing economy.

Digital marketing channels within the sharing economy are typically divided into three domains including, e-mail, social media, and search engine marketing or SEM.

 E-mail- a form of direct marketing characterized as being informative, promotional, and often a means of customer relationship management. Organization can update the activity or promotion information to the user by subscribing the newsletter mail that happened in consuming. Success is reliant upon a company’s ability to access contact information from its past, present, and future clientele.
Social Media- Social media has the capability to reach a larger audience in a shorter time frame than traditional marketing channels. This makes social media a powerful tool for consumer engagement and the dissemination of information.
Search Engine Marketing or SEM- Requires more specialized knowledge of the technology embedded in online platforms. This marketing strategy requires long-term commitment and dedication to the ongoing improvement of a company’s digital presence.

Other emerging digital marketing channels, particularly branded mobile apps, have excelled in the sharing economy. Branded mobile apps are created specifically to initiate engagement between customers and the company. This engagement is typically facilitated through entertainment, information, or market transaction.

See also

References

Further reading

 
 
 Guilbeault, Douglas. “DIGITAL MARKETING IN THE DISINFORMATION AGE.” Journal of International Affairs, vol. 71, no. 1.5, 2018, pp. 33–42. JSTOR, . Accessed 28 Jun. 2022.
 Bala, Madhu and Verma, Deepak, A Critical Review of Digital Marketing (October 1, 2018). M. Bala, D. Verma (2018). A Critical Review of Digital Marketing. International Journal of Management, IT & Engineering, 8(10), 321–339., Available at SSRN:  
 TRUMAN, E. (2022). Picturing Digital Tastes: #unicornlatte, Social Photography, and Instagram Food Marketing. In E. J. H. CONTOIS & Z. KISH (Eds.), Food Instagram: Identity, Influence, and Negotiation (pp. 115–131). University of Illinois Press. 
  
 World Health Organization. (2019). How media is bought: the digital marketing ecosystem. In MONITORING AND RESTRICTING DIGITAL MARKETING OF UNHEALTHY PRODUCTS TO CHILDREN AND ADOLESCENTS (pp. 16–31). World Health Organization.  
 
 Morris, N. Understanding Digital Marketing: Marketing Strategies for Engaging the Digital Generation. J Direct Data Digit Mark Pract 10, 384–387 (2009).  
 Parsons, A., Zeisser, M. and Waitman, R. (1998) ‘Organizing today for the digital marketing of tomorrow’, Journal of Interactive Marketing, 12(1), pp. 31–46. .
  
  
  
 
 
 

 
Advertising techniques
Marketing techniques
Online advertising
Promotion and marketing communications
Types of marketing